Mohan Prakash is one of the general secretaries of INC He is one of the spokespersons in Indian National Congress. He has been MLA once from Rajakhera, District Dholpur (Rajasthan) but lost his deposit in the next election.

Personal life
Prakash was born December 26, 1950.  His father was Mangal Singh.  He obtained a master's of art degree at M.G. Kashi Vidyapeeth, Varanasi) and a bachelor of journalism degree from B.H.U..  He was an MLA from Rajakera constituency of Dholpur district and one of the most prominent leaders of Congress.

References

Living people
Indian National Congress politicians
Year of birth missing (living people)